Plomin Power Station is a coal-fired power station near Plomin, Croatia. As of 2007, its production corresponded to 13% of Croatia's electricity needs.

The power plant consists of two boiler units: TE Plomin A, built in 1969 and TE Plomin B, built in 2000. Both are operated by Hrvatska elektroprivreda, and the latter was co-owned with RWE Power AG. On 28 May 2015, the contract signed by the two parties in 1996 expired, thereby transferring the thermal power plant into 100 percent ownership of HEP. They generate a total of 330 megawatt. In 2007 their total output was 2187 gigawatt-hours; in 2009 it was 1927 GWh.

In 2011, the reconstruction of the Plomin A Power Station was proposed for a more efficient and safer functioning. The capacity of the new station, named Plomin C, will be of 500 MW instead the 125 MW of the old one, a fact that created ambiguities as it was mostly viewed as a new project rather than a reconstruction of the Plomin A plant.  As a result, the Plomin Power Station capacity will increase from 335 MW to 710 MW. The upper limit of 335 MW was planned to be the maximum to be allowed at Plomin plant, an increase in capacity being possible only using gas rather than coal. However, the Croatian government supported the project, viewing it as “rational and cost effective”.

Components of the Plomin Power Station

Plomin A
Plomin A power station was built in 1969. It represents one of the two existing power plants at Plomin Power Station from Istria, Croatia. The capacity of Plomin A is 120 MW and it is operated by  Hrvatska elektroprivreda.

In 2011, the reconstruction and modernization of the plant was proposed and its incorporation into Plomin C power station. The plant will be stopped at the end of 2017. The latest news are: because of big fire of the electric cables (control room) maybe the plant will never start again.

Plomin B
Plomin B power station was built in 2000 and it is the second plant at Plomin power station. It is operated by HEP. Plomin B has a capacity of 210 MW.

Plomin C
Plomin C is a 500 megawatt (MW) coal power plant to be built in Istria, Croatia as a third unit of the Plomin Power Plant. The project is operated by the Croatian electricity company Hrvatska elektroprivreda (HEP) and it was presented as a reconstruction of the Plomin A Power Plant, even though its capacity is planned to be four times bigger than the previous one (125 MW). This has generated a lot of discussions on the legality and sustainability of the project among local and international groups, as well as from local officials. The value of the investment is of EUR 800 million.

The project is planned to start in 2013 and end by 2017/2018.

Description of the project 
The purpose of the project is to reconstruct Plomin A Power Plant and to assure a safe long-term source of energy, as well as to decrease the dependence of the country on the imported energy. Croatia being a country that imports more than 30% of the consumed energy. Environmental NGOs affirm that, on the other side, it will increase the import of coal as the country does not have domestic resources, thus maintaining the external dependence. HEP defended by saying that unlike gas and oil, coal comes from politically stable countries, mainly OECD, thus the supply for this raw material can be easily assured. Additionally, the project is presented as improving the environmental conditions on the region as the old Plomin A Power Plant will be closed and C will be opened. The construction of the new station will be realized in accordance with the guidance of the European Union so that the “Best Available Techniques” (BAT) are used. The BAT represent the most advanced and efficient methods that aim to reduce to the maximum the emissions and the environmental damage caused by power plants. Furthermore, HEP classifies Plomin C as a “near zero emission” power plant. However, according to estimates, Plomin C will emit 2.644 million tonnes carbon dioxide equivalent.

Legal framework
One of the first phases of the Plomin C project was that it had to be accepted by the Croatian government.  Due to the necessity of additional energy sources, Ministry of Spatial Planning and Construction approved HEP's Environmental Impact Assessment of the project in the middle of June, 2012. At the same time, the Environment and Nature Protection Minister, Mihael Zmajlovic, said that opting for coal instead of other raw materials was a „more rational and cost effective” way of operating the Plomin C. The newest technologies that would be used in the construction of the plant should assure that the environmental damage is minimal, pointed out the Minister.
The neighbor country, Slovenia was also consulted on the early age of planning of the Plomin C that was expected to have environmental impact not only on Croatia, but on the whole region. After continuous consultations with the specialized institutions, the Slovenian Ministry of Agriculture and Environment concluded that the project will not have significant effects on the environment and agreed on the construction of the plant.

Hunton & Williams, a legal consultancy company, was hired by HEP to advise on international tender for the design, construction and operation of the power plant.

Potential investors
As RWE the investor in the Plomin B did not express interest in joining this project, HEP was looking for a partner interested in Plomin C coal-based power plant. RWE explained the decision by their current capital constraint, as well as adjustment of the company's strategy related to the composition of the European power plant portfolio. However, RWE said that it will support the project from its position of shareholder of Plomin B.
By 14 September 2012, the date of application deadline, seven companies expressed their interest in Plomin C. However, HEP short-listed only four companies, which were asked to submit their bidding offers by the end of 2012 year.
The short-listed candidates are:
 Edison S.p.A. (Italy),
 Korea Electric Power Corporation - KOSEP (South Korea)
 Marubeni (Japan)
 Pol-Mot (Poland)
The selection is planned to end at the beginning of the second quarter of 2013.

Zelena Akcija/Green Action sent an awareness letter to the four companies, informing them regarding the economic and environmental negative effects the project may have and the locals opposition against its construction.

Environmental issues

Zelena Akcija (Friends of the Earth Croatia) and Green Istria, supported by locals as well, submitted a legal appeal to the Administrative Court in Rijeka on October 29, 2012, against the Ministry of Environmental Protection to challenge the environmental permit that was approved by them for the construction of the Plomin C Thermal Power Plant. They demanded to stop any further activities related to the project progress until the Court comes up with a decision.

The main reasons brought by the appealing party were the high CO2 emissions that will lead to worsening of the population health in the region as well as global warming effect and increased dependence on the imported coal. Furthermore, it will not allow Croatia to meet the conditions imposed by EU regarding the decrease of greenhouse gas emissions by 2050. This may affect even the economic side of the project as it may lead to the purchase of additional greenhouse gas emissions credits under the European Union Emissions Trading Scheme. Prof.dr.sc Enco Tireli, a local expert,  who worked for HEP for more than 20 years and was also construction manager for Plomin B, confirmed the fact that the project will not be profitable due to the additional payment for CO2 credits. According to EU goals, Croatia's total emissions will be in the range between 1.566 and 6.264 million tonnes Carbon dioxide equivalent (CO2eq) annually, while only Plomin C would emit 2.644 million tonnes CO2eq.  Thus, there will be no reserves of CO2 emissions left for other sectors as industry and transportation.

Zelena Akcija and Green Istria invoked that the assessment done by the Ministry did not consider in depth all the implications of the project on the human health and wellbeing.  Also, Dusica Radojic, the President of Green Istria, pointed out that "the plans to build Plomin C are in conflict with the Istria County Spatial Plan, which clearly defines that any new unit at the site cannot exceed 125 MW and must run on gas, not coal”. The two associations stressed that “the consequences of such irresponsible approach will be supported by the local population, and the economic damages will have to be covered from the taxes paid by all citizens of Croatia”.
Zelena Akcija and Green Istria hope that the Court will consider their arguments and cancel the environmental permit allowing the construction of the Plomin C coal power plant.

See also

List of chimneys
List of towers
List of tallest freestanding structures in the world

References

External links

 Thermal Power Plant Plomin 2
 Plomin C Thermal Power Plant at SourceWatch

Energy infrastructure completed in 1969
Energy infrastructure completed in 2000
Towers completed in 2000
Coal-fired power stations in Croatia
Chimneys in Croatia
Buildings and structures in Istria County
Thermal power plants